Ray Du English  is a Taiwanese educational YouTube channel hosted by two siblings, including the titular Ray Du [都省瑞; ]), who have posted English education materials since 2015. Their unconventional approach to English education has been featured positively in various Taiwanese media outlets.

Profile 
Both Ray Du and his sister Crown Du graduated from the well-known Fu Jen Catholic University Department of English Language and Literature. Ray obtained a master's degree from Fu Jen, which prompted him to found Ray Du English.

Key events 

 On 30 March 2018, Ray Du confirmed that his sister, Crown Du, does not exist and is a product of intellectual creation. 

 On 10 April 2020, Ray Du, along with graphic designer Aaron Nieh and other like-minded individuals, initiated a fundraising campaign aimed to showcase Taiwan's efforts and willingness to help in the fight against the COVID-19 coronavirus pandemic by publishing an advertisement in the New York Times. The "Taiwan Can Help" campaign raised around NT$10 million (US$330,000) from over 26,000 contributors. The advert was published in the New York Times on 14 April 2020.

Publications

See also 
 List of most-subscribed YouTube channels

References

External links 
Ray Du English Facebook Page
YouTube channels
Taiwanese YouTubers
Fu Jen Catholic University alumni